HMS Melbreak was a  destroyer of the Royal Navy. She was a member of the third subgroup of the class, and saw service in the Second World War. All the ships of this class were named after British fox hunts. She was the first Royal Navy warship with this name, after the Melbreak hunt in Cumbria. In 1942 she was adopted by the civil community of Cockermouth in Cumberland, as part of Warship Week.

Service history

On commissioning Melbreak served in the English Channel, but in 1943 she was deployed to the Mediterranean. In 1944 she served mostly in the English Channel and was part of the escort force for the assault and landings in Normandy, as part of the D-Day operations.

On 28 August 1944 she was attacked in the English Channel by an unknown aircraft, causing 20 casualties including five killed. She was subsequently repaired in Barry, South Wales.

On 7 May 1945 Melbreak suffered considerable damage on grounding and was repaired at Sheerness. She was subsequently placed in reserve at Chatham. She was in attendance at the Coronation Fleet Review in Portsmouth in 1953.

She was subsequently sold for scrap to Thos. W. Ward and arrived at their ship breaking yard in Grays on 22 November 1956.

References

Sources
 Colledge, J. J. & Warlow, Ben, Ships of the Royal Navy: The Complete Record of all Fighting Ships of the Royal Navy from the 15th Century to the Present, Newbury, 2010
 English, John, The Hunts – A history of the design, development and careers of the 86 destroyers of this class built for the Royal and Allied Navies during World War II, Cumbria, 1987  (World Ship Society) 
 Whitley, M. J., Destroyers of World War Two – an international encyclopedia, London, 1988 
 Gardiner, Robert (ed.), Conway's All the World's Fighting Ships 1922–1946, London, 1987

Further reading

Hunt-class destroyers of the Royal Navy
World War II destroyers of the United Kingdom
Ships built on the Isle of Wight
1942 ships